The 1962 United States Senate election in Vermont took place on November 6, 1962. Incumbent Republican George Aiken ran successfully for re-election to another term in the United States Senate, defeating Democratic nominee W. Robert Johnson.

As Aiken was nominated by the Democratic party in the next election for this seat, as of 2022, this is the last time the Democratic candidate lost the election for the Class 3 Senate Seat in Vermont.

Republican primary

Results

Democratic primary

Results

General election

Results

References

Vermont
1962
1962 Vermont elections